The 1994 Copenhagen Open was a men's tennis tournament played on indoor carpet courts in Copenhagen, Denmark that was part of the World Series of the 1994 ATP Tour. It was the sixth edition of the tournament and was held from 28 February through 7 March 1994. Fourth-seeded Yevgeny Kafelnikov won the singles title.

Finals

Singles

 Yevgeny Kafelnikov defeated  Daniel Vacek, 6–3, 7–5.
 It was Kafelnikov's 2nd singles title of the year and of his career.

Doubles

 Martin Damm /  Brett Steven defeated  David Prinosil /  Udo Riglewski, 6–3, 6–4.

References

External links
 ITF tournament edition details

Copenhagen Open
Copenhagen Open
1994 in Danish tennis